Mark Gerban (born November 30, 1979) a former professional rower. He is notable as the first rower in history to represent the State of Palestine at the 2005 World Championships. Competing in the Lightweight Men's Single, he had the highest placed World Championship finish (16th) of a Palestinian athlete in any sport (excluding Special Olympics events).

Early life and education 
Gerban was born to a Jewish mother and Palestinian father in the city of Philadelphia, Pennsylvania.

Gerban graduated from Lower Merion High School in Ardmore, Pennsylvania in 1998. While there he was taught to scull by Coach Harold Finigan. In 2003, he graduated from Drexel University with a triple major in Production Operations Management, Economics, and International Business.  From 1998 until 2001 he was a member of AEPi

While at Drexel on an athletic scholarship, he competed with the NCAA Division I Varsity Swimming program, where he was a multiple America East Conference Swimming Champion. He also managed to become a multiple Royal Canadian Henley Regatta and US National Champion in the sport of rowing during his off-season. Additionally, Mark was the swimming representative for the Student Athlete Advisory Board (SAAB) at Drexel.

Professional rowing career 
Mark worked professionally for two years with the CIGNA Corporation before turning into a professional rower in 2005.  During this time, he trained and competed with German National and Olympic Team athletes.

He had been fully sponsored by the Palestinian Rowing Federation, from which Iradj El-Qalqili arranged him to train under coach Martin Strohmenger and Rita Hendes in Hamburg, Germany.

Mark trained at the Ruder-Gesellschaft HANSA e.V., located along the banks of the Alster and competed in the following international events for Palestine:

Discrimination 
Prior to his graduation from Drexel University, Gerban wrote a series of articles for the university's student newspaper, The Triangle, which was based on the Israeli-Palestinian conflict and his perspective of being both Jewish and Palestinian. While his stated intention was to promote peaceful dialogue, he was accused of being "Pro-Palestinian" and "Anti-Semetic."

A media controversy ensued, and the Israeli Consulate decided to take action.  Through their intervention, a public event was organized at Drexel University to counter Gerban's presented arguments.

The Jewish Exponent published an opinion piece by Daniel Pipes, who stated Gerban's work was "the literary equivalent of the suicide bombers", and "unreasoning and aggressive with an ultimately murderous intent."

Gerban responded to Pipes's accusations with an article, where he concluded:
I think both the Palestinians and Israelis can live together — my family proves it. The only thing we can hope for is to find the right leadership and the will to compromise. Remember, when a strong military force like Israel pressures the Palestinians, who have almost nothing to lose, you will almost surely observe a rise of armed militants who are willing to resolve to dirty fighting (suicide bombings, etc.) as a last resort. Seeing the entire perspective has really changed my views. Yes, I believe that this "issue" can be settled peacefully, but only if the Israelis and Palestinians put their differences aside — before it's too late.

After the media controversy at Drexel, Gerban's interest in Palestinian issues grew.  It was also during this time that he first considered rowing for Palestine.

Following his decision to represent Palestine, he claimed to have been exposed to a high level of discrimination. He claimed that, while a member and live-in resident of Malta Boat Club along Boathouse Row in Philadelphia, he was forced out on the grounds of "representing a country associated with terrorism".

The Palestinian Rowing Federation later filed a complaint with USRowing against Malta Boat Club for their actions. After an official review, USRowing found no basis for the complaint.  Claiming he found it difficult to train in the United States, Gerban moved to Germany and was given full sponsorship through the support of the Palestinian Rowing Federation.

References

External links 
 

1979 births
Living people
American male rowers
Jewish American sportspeople
Palestinian male rowers
American people of Palestinian descent
Drexel University alumni
Rowers from Philadelphia
Jews in the State of Palestine
Lower Merion High School alumni
21st-century American Jews